El Paso is a city in Woodford and McLean counties in the U.S. state of Illinois. The population was 2,756 at the 2020 census. The Woodford County portion of El Paso is part of the Peoria Metropolitan Statistical Area.

El Paso is a small community in central Illinois that took on more characteristics of a highway community after the construction of Interstate 39, which supplanted the older alignment of U.S. Highway 51.

History
El Paso was founded by George Gibson and James Wathen. Gibson gave it the Spanish name "El Paso", either after El Paso, Texas, or because of a nearby railroad junction.

In August 1975, the city became the last locality in the contiguous United States to convert its telephone service from manual switching; prior to that time, telephones in the city could not be dialed directly from any outside location. The assistance of an operator was necessary to place the call, and local telephone numbers consisted of four digits. Parts of the outer Aleutian Islands in Alaska could not be dialed directly until the early 1980s.

Geography
El Paso is located in southeastern Woodford County at  (40.738800, -89.016034). A small portion of the city limits extends east along U.S. Route 24 into northern McLean County. US 24 leads east  to Interstate 55 in Chenoa and west  to Peoria. Interstate 39 crosses the west side of El Paso, with access from Exit 14 (US 24); the Interstate highway leads south  to Interstate 55 in Normal and north  to La Salle. Illinois Route 251 follows the former alignment of U.S. Route 51 through the center of El Paso, leading north  to Minonk and south  to Kappa.

The city sits on high ground that drains north to the East Branch of Panther Creek and south to the headwaters of Wolf Creek. Both creek systems are south-flowing tributaries of the Mackinaw River and part of the Illinois River watershed.

Demographics

As of the 2000 United States Census, there were 2,695 people, 980 households, and 686 families residing in the city. The racial makeup of the city was 98.89% White, 0.15% African American, 0.15% Native American, 0.22% Asian, 0.22% from other races, and 0.37% from two or more races. Hispanic or Latino of any race were 0.71% of the population.

There were 980 households, out of which 35.9% had children under the age of 18 living with them, 57.9% were married couples living together, 8.6% had a female householder with no husband present, and 29.9% were non-families. 25.2% of all households were made up of individuals, and 13.1% had someone living alone who was 65 years of age or older. The average household size was 2.58 and the average family size was 3.12.

In the city, the population was spread out, with 26.6% under the age of 18, 8.6% from 18 to 24, 28.7% from 25 to 44, 19.8% from 45 to 64, and 16.3% who were 65 years of age or older. The median age was 36 years. For every 100 females, there were 92.1 males. For every 100 females age 18 and over, there were 87.7 males.

The median income for a household in the city was $47,745, and the median income for a family was $55,286. Males had a median income of $36,406 versus $25,174 for females. The per capita income for the city was $21,730. About 1.6% of families and 3.2% of the population were below the poverty line, including 2.1% of those under age 18 and 6.6% of those age 65 or over.

Culture

Attractions 
 El Paso Public Library, a Carnegie library built in 1907
 Archbishop Fulton John Sheen Spiritual Centre
 El Paso Golf Club

Notable people 

 Chick Evans, college athletics coach; raised in El Paso
 Byron Keith, actor, best known for recurring roles in Batman (TV series) and 77 Sunset Strip; born in El Paso
 Fulton J. Sheen, Catholic archbishop and televangelist; born in El Paso
 Elsa Swartz, composer and music educator; born in El Paso
 Clifford J. Vogelsang, Illinois state senator, judge, and lawyer; born in El Paso

Education 
El Paso's school district, CUSD #11, is the product of a consolidation with the school district of Gridley, IL. CUSD #11's schools are split between El Paso and Gridley: 
 El Paso Gridley High School - Housing all of the high school students for the district
 El Paso Gridley Junior High School - Housing all of the upper and lower levels of junior high (grades 5, 6, 7, and 8) students for the district
 Centennial School - Housing all the grade 3 and 4 elementary students of the district
 Jefferson Park - Housing all the preschool, kindergarten, and grade 1 and 2 elementary students of the district

References

External links

Cities in Illinois
Cities in Woodford County, Illinois
Cities in McLean County, Illinois
Peoria metropolitan area, Illinois